The 2018 Aspria Tennis Cup was a professional tennis tournament played on clay courts. It was the thirteenth edition of the tournament which was part of the 2018 ATP Challenger Tour. It took place in Milan, Italy between 25 June and 1 July 2018.

Singles main-draw entrants

Seeds

 1 Rankings are as of 18 June 2018.

Other entrants
The following players received wildcards into the singles main draw:
  Filippo Baldi
  Riccardo Balzerani
  Julian Ocleppo
  Andrea Pellegrino

The following players received entry into the singles main draw as special exempts:
  Thiemo de Bakker
  Scott Griekspoor

The following player received entry into the singles main draw as an alternate:
  Federico Gaio

The following players received entry from the qualifying draw:
  Hugo Grenier
  Gianluca Mager
  Alexei Popyrin
  Jordi Samper-Montaña

Champions

Singles

  Laslo Đere def.  Gianluca Mager 6–2, 6–1.

Doubles

  Julian Ocleppo /  Andrea Vavassori def.  Gonzalo Escobar /  Fernando Romboli 4–6, 6–1, [11–9].

References

2018 ATP Challenger Tour
2018